A border checkpoint is a location on an international border where travelers or goods are inspected and allowed (or denied) passage through. Authorization often is required to enter a country through its borders. Access-controlled borders often have a limited number of checkpoints where they can be crossed without legal sanctions. Arrangements or treaties may be formed to allow or mandate less restrained crossings (e.g. the Schengen Agreement). Land border checkpoints (land ports of entry) can be contrasted with the customs and immigration facilities at seaports, international airports, and other ports of entry.

Checkpoints generally serve two purposes:
 To prevent entrance of individuals who are either undesirable (e.g. criminals or others who pose threats) or simply unauthorized to enter.
 To prevent entrance of goods that are illegal or subject to restriction, or to collect tariffs.

Checkpoints are usually staffed by a uniformed service (sometimes referred to as customs service or border patrol agents).

In some countries (e.g. China) there are border checkpoints for both those entering and those exiting the country, while in others (e.g. U.S. and Canada), there are border checkpoints only when entering the country. (There are also United States Border Patrol interior checkpoints.)

Definitions in European Union (Schengen) law 

The Schengen Borders Code, which forms part of the law of the European Union, defines some terms as follows (particularities with respect to the EU are left out, in order to emphasize general usability of those definitions): 
"Border crossing point" means any crossing point authorized by the competent authorities for the crossing of external borders (Article 2 sec. 8 of the Schengen Borders Code);
"Border control" means the activity carried out at a border, [...] in response exclusively to an intention to cross or the act of crossing that border, regardless of any other consideration, consisting of border checks and border surveillance (Article 2 sec. 9 of the Schengen Borders Code);
"Border checks" means the checks carried out at border crossing points, to ensure that persons, including their means of transport and the objects in their possession, may be authorised to enter the territory [...] or authorised to leave it (Article 2 sec. 10 of the Schengen Borders Code);
"Border surveillance" means the surveillance of borders between border crossing points and the surveillance of border crossing points outside the fixed opening hours, in order to prevent persons from circumventing border checks (Article 2 sec. 10 of the Schengen Borders Code).
"Second line check" means a further check which may be carried out in a special location away from the location at which all persons are checked (first line)
These definitions mean that a place where a road crosses an internal Schengen border is legally not a "border crossing point".

Busiest checkpoints in the world

Land
This is a list of the busiest land border checkpoints in the world, handling more than 35 million travelers in both directions annually. These travelers (or individual crossings) comprise pedestrians, drivers and vehicle passengers. International border checkpoints are in green.

Notes:
 As the United States does not have border checkpoints for outgoing traffic, incoming traffic figures are doubled to give a fair comparison. See detailed notes in table.
 El Paso Port of Entry has been excluded, as its total represents the sum of six individual checkpoints at the end of six separate bridges, with no single checkpoint meeting the minimum number of crossings required for this list.

Air

This is a list of the busiest airports in the world, by international passenger traffic, as of 2018. Airports serving international passengers are effectively checkpoints, and have the proper customs, immigration and quarantine facilities. Airports Council International's (January–December) preliminary figures are as follows.

Sea
This is a list of the busiest seaports in the world, with proper customs, immigration and quarantine facilities to be deemed as maritime checkpoints. Although figures simply represent total passenger traffic, most (if not, all) of the passengers served at these ports are bound for other countries and have to pass through checkpoint (i.e. the port is not a domestic one). This list only includes ports that handle more than 4 million passengers annually.

Note:
 The four passenger ports in China, Hong Kong and Macau in this list operate services to and from each other. These passenger ports are effectively checkpoints, as they have the proper customs, immigration and quarantine facilities.

Gallery

See also 

 Alcabala
 Border
 Border control
 Border outpost
 Checkpoint Charlie and the Berlin Wall
 Customs
 Frontier Closed Area is the border area in Hong Kong with China
 Garitas in Mexico
 Israeli checkpoint
 Schengen Agreement
 The United States–Mexico border and Canada–United States border
 List of Canada–United States border crossings
 List of Mexico–United States border crossings

Notes

References

Borders
International border crossings